Giuseppe Mentessi (29 September 1857 in Ferrara, - 14 June 1931 in Milan) was an Italian painter.

Biography
He established himself as a painter in Milan, where he taught at the Brera Academy. He exhibited a triptych of the Madonna at the Biennale in Venice of 1897. Described as having a mystic suavity and spiritual grace  many of his painters center upon an emotive representation of motherhood.  Innocente Cantinotti and Antonio Sant'Elia were among his pupils.

References

19th-century Italian painters
Italian male painters
20th-century Italian painters
Painters from Milan
Painters from Ferrara
Academic staff of Brera Academy
1857 births
1931 deaths
19th-century Italian male artists
20th-century Italian male artists